The 1st Australian Academy of Cinema and Television Arts International Awards (more commonly known as the AACTA International Awards), were presented by the Australian Academy of Cinema and Television Arts (AACTA), a not for profit organisation whose aim is to identify, award, promote and celebrate Australia's greatest achievements in film and television. The Academy, which normally hand out awards to Australian made films, presented awards for the best films of 2011 regardless of geography.

The Artist won three awards, for Best Film, Best Director and Best Actor. Other winners were The Iron Lady, The Ides of March and Margin Call, with one. The ceremony was presented in segments, during the 2011 AACTA Awards for Australian films, on the Nine Network.

Background
On 18 August 2011, the Australian Academy of Cinema and Television Arts (AACTA) was established by the Australian Film Institute (AFI), a non for profit organisation whose aim is "to recognise and honour outstanding achievement in the Australian film and television industry." The purpose of the Academy was to raise the profile of Australian film and television in Australia and abroad, and to change the way it rewards talent from its previous jury system, to the more recognised and understood elements of foreign film organisations. The president of the awards is Australian actor Geoffrey Rush.

By 8 November 2011, the Academy announced plans for an international awards program, which would hand out awards to films regardless of geography. The winners are determined by a jury of Australian screen practitioners, in five categories: Best Film, Best Direction, Best Screenplay, Best Actor and Best Actress. The nominees were announced at the AACTA Awards Luncheon on 15 January 2011, in conjunction with the Australia Week Black Tie Gala.

Ceremony
The awards were presented on 27 January 2012, at a low key event in Soho House West Hollywood, in Los Angeles, California. The event was shown in segments during the 2011 AACTA Awards for Australian films, on 31 January 2012 at the Sydney Opera House, which was broadcast on the Nine Network.

Presenters

Winners and nominees
Winners are listed first and highlighted in boldface.

Films with multiple nominations and awards

The following films received multiple nominations.

 4: The Artist, Melancholia, We Need to Talk About Kevin
 3: The Descendants, The Ides of March, Margin Call, Midnight in Paris, Moneyball
 2: Hugo, The Tree of Life

The following film received multiple awards.

 3: The Artist

See also
 1st AACTA Awards
 17th Critics’ Choice Awards
 18th Screen Actors Guild Awards
 65th British Academy Film Awards
 69th Golden Globe Awards
 84th Academy Awards

References

External links
 The Official Australian Academy of Cinema and Television Arts website

AACTA International Awards
AACTA International Awards
AACTA International Awards
AACTA Awards ceremonies
AACTA International